Juan Isidro Moreno Espinal (Mata del Jobo, Sabaneta; 6 August 1924 – Santiago; 4 January 2015) was a poet from the Dominican Republic.

He was the eldest son of Domingo Moreno Jimenes, the developer of the Posthumist movement.

Works 
 Vida y Poesía

References

1924 births
2015 deaths
People from Santiago Rodríguez Province
Dominican Republic male poets
Dominican Republic people of Basque descent
Dominican Republic people of Canarian descent
Dominican Republic people of Venezuelan descent
20th-century Dominican Republic poets
20th-century male writers